The 1976 United States presidential election in Michigan was held on November 2, 1976 as part of the 1976 United States presidential election. 

Michigan was won by the incumbent President Gerald Ford, who won his home state with 51.83% of the vote, carrying its 21 electoral votes. This result made Michigan about 7.5% more Republican than the nation at large. However, he lost the general election to Democratic candidate Jimmy Carter. This marked the last time a Democrat won the presidency without carrying Michigan, although Democrats won the popular vote without the state in 2016. Carter also became the first Democrat to win the White House without carrying Macomb County since Woodrow Wilson in 1916. The state would not vote for a losing candidate again until 2000, and for the loser of the popular vote until 2004. 

As of the 2020 presidential election, this is the only election since 1940 in which Michigan voted for a different candidate than nearby Pennsylvania, as well as the last time that Michigan voted more Republican than Texas, Oklahoma, or Florida. It is also the last time the Democratic candidate lost Michigan but won neighboring Ohio.

Primaries

Democratic primaries
 Jimmy Carter - 43.40%
 Mo Udall - 43.06%
 George Wallace - 6.94%

Republican primaries
 Gerald Ford - 64.94%
 Ronald Reagan - 34.25%

Results

Results by county

See also
 United States presidential elections in Michigan

References

Michigan
1976
1976 Michigan elections
Presidential election